Epanodos is a figure of speech used when the same word or two similar words are repeated within a passage of text.

References 

Poetic devices
Figures of speech